He Poos Clouds is the second album by the Canadian indie rocker Owen Pallett, released on June 13, 2006, on Blocks Recording Club in Canada and Tomlab internationally.

The songs on the album (excluding the fifth and tenth tracks) are loosely connected to the eight schools of magic in the role-playing game Dungeons & Dragons, and the title track's lyrics ostensibly refer to the Nintendo video game series The Legend of Zelda, as well as The Chronicles of Narnia. Pallett has also said that the album is a reflection on how atheists confront death.

The track "This Lamb Sells Condos" refers to the Toronto real estate developer Brad J. Lamb, who had previously used the song's title phrase as an advertising slogan. In the song, Pallett imagines an argument between the developer and his wife that alludes heavily to various fashion designers.

The album cover art is by Robin Fry.

The album was named the winner of the 2006 Polaris Music Prize on September 18, 2006.

Track listing
Eight songs are directly related to the eight schools of magic in Dungeons & Dragons: the school of magic correlating to the song is in parentheses.

"The Arctic Circle" – 4:24 (Abjuration)
"He Poos Clouds" – 3:31 (Illusion)
"This Lamb Sells Condos" – 4:39 (Conjuration)
"If I Were a Carp" – 4:03 (Necromancy)
"→" – 0:57
"I'm Afraid of Japan" – 3:56 (Enchantment)
"Song Song Song" – 4:31 (Evocation)
"Many Lives → 49 MP" – 2:56 (Divination)
"Do You Love?" – 3:03 (Transmutation)
"The Pooka Sings" – 5:25

Personnel

Owen Pallett – organ, viola, violin, harpsichord, piano, bass guitar, vocals
Bethany Bergman – first violin
John Marshman – violoncello
Karen Moffatt – viola
Ed Reifel – percussion
Leon Taheny – percussion
Jenny Thompson – second violin
Doug Tielli – trombone

Loretto Reid – concertina (1)
Bob Wiseman – accordion (9)
Lori Cullen – vocals (1, 3, 7, 10)
Casey Mecija and Jenny Mecija – vocals  (3, 7)
Lex Vaughn – monologue (3)
Aidan Koper, Jesse Foster, Tim Fagan – shouting (8)

References

2006 albums
Owen Pallett albums
Polaris Music Prize-winning albums